A trolleytruck (also known as a freight trolley or trolley truck) is a trolleybus-like vehicle used for carrying cargo instead of passengers. A trolleytruck is usually a type of electric truck powered by two overhead wires, from which it draws electricity using two trolley poles.  Two current collectors are required in order to supply and return current, because the return current cannot pass to the ground (as is done by streetcars on rails) since trolleytrucks use tires that are insulators.  Lower powered trucks, such as might be seen on the streets of a city, tend to use trolley poles for current collection. Higher powered trucks, such as those used for large construction or mining projects, may exceed the power capacity of trolley poles and have to use pantographs instead. Trolleytrucks have been used in various places around the world and are still in use in cities in Russia and Ukraine, as well as at mines in North America and Africa. Because they draw power from the mains, trolleytrucks can use renewable energy sources – modern trolleytrucks systems are under test in Sweden and Germany along highways using diesel–electric hybrids to reduce emissions.

Use throughout the world

Austria
Trolleytrucks were used in St. Lambrecht, Austria by the Nobel Industries dynamite factory from 16 November 1945 to 21 April 1951.  Trolleytrucks were used to carry dynamite over the Alps just after World War II due to the shortages of material that for a time prevented the use of diesel trucks.  In the 1950s the material shortages had been alleviated so the trolleytrucks were replaced with diesel trucks and the former power lines were taken down.  Some trucks from the abandoned line were reconverted to trolley buses and used along streets in Kapfenberg.

Bulgaria
A Ukrainian built trolleytruck started service in Pleven, Bulgaria in 1987, but that truck may no longer be in service since it is stored in the trolleybus depot.

Canada
The Québec Cartier Mining Company used trolleytrucks in its iron ore mine in Québec from 1970 until 1977 when the iron ore deposit was exhausted and the mine closed down.  The power supply for this remote mine was a power plant taken out of a diesel electric locomotive.

As of 2022 the Copper Mountain Mining Corporation operating at Copper Mountain, British Columbia is converting its diesel-electric haul trucks to trolley assist for the climb out of the pit, with power being supplied by the mine's existing transmission supply from BC Hydro.

Germany

The German Federal Ministry for the Environment is building a network of overhead wires along the autobahn for diesel-electric hybrids, allowing trucks to cruise on electric power. A short test stretch has been built on an Armybase in Brandenburg, with longer routes in Hesse and Schleswig-Holstein planned for 2018.
The Test in Schleswig-Holstein has started on 1 June 2019 and in Hesse on 7 May 2019.
A further Test is planned in Baden-Württemberg.

Italy
Trolleytrucks were used by the AEM electric utility company of Milan, Italy to supply construction materials and service to the San Giacomo Dam (constructed 1940–1950) and the second Cancano Dam (constructed 1952–1956). The two trolleytruck lines in the Valtellina valley that helped to build then supply the dams
along the Spöl river were used from 1938 to 1962.

Namibia
The Rössing Uranium Mine in Namibia installed a trolley assist system around 1986.  The diesel electric drive Komatsu 730E dump trucks were converted at that time to use trolley power assist for the climb out of the mine to the crusher.  The fleet numbered more than 10 vehicles as of 2001.

South Africa
Trolleytrucks were introduced to the Palabora copper mine in South Africa in 1980.

The South African Iron and Steel Industrial Corporation (ISCOR) installed a  trolley power assist line
for  diesel electric trucks at its Shishen mine in March 1982. Afterwards the company also installed a trolley power assist system at its Grootegeluk coal mine in Lephalale, South Africa.  ISCOR (now known as Mittal Steel South Africa) is the largest user of trolley power assist trolleytruck systems in the world.

Soviet Union, Russia, Ukraine
Many cities in the Soviet Union operated trolleytrucks. The MAZ-525 truck model was converted to a trolleytruck design in 1954 in Kharkiv, Ukraine. The Kharkiv experiment with trolleytrucks was stopped because of disadvantages.

Nowadays trolleytrucks operate in several cities in Ukraine such as Donetsk and Sevastopol as well as cities in Russia such as Bryansk and Saint Petersburg.  One type, the KTG-1, is made for service and repair of the urban trolleybus vehicles; while another, the KTG-2, is used for transporting goods.

Sweden
The first public electrified motorway opened in Sweden on 22 June 2016 on a stretch of European route E16 near Gävle, allowing hybrid and battery electric Scania lorries to run from overhead wires.

Switzerland
Trolleytrucks were used in Gümmenen and Mühleberg Switzerland between 1918 and 1922 during the construction of the dam that retains Lake Wohlen. The trucks were built by Tribelhorn, and they used the Stoll system of current collection.

United States
Trolleytrucks have been used in mining operations and in road maintenance projects in the United States.

Michigan
From 1939 to 1964 the International Salt Company mine in River Rouge, Michigan used trolleytrucks that were converted Euclid  models.  This was an underground salt mine.  Batteries were used to power the trucks when they strayed away from the overhead wires. For use within a mine the overhead wires may occasionally be relocated as excavation activity progresses.  Hence the trolleytrucks used in mines do not necessarily have a travel route that is as fixed as the trolleytruck routes used in cities.

California
From 1956 to 1971 the Riverside Cement Company in Bloomington, California, operated Kenworth  dump trucks converted to trolleytruck use at the Crestmore Quarry near Riverside, California.  The trucks were equipped with "extension cords" for use of electric power near the shovel down in the mine.  The long extension cords stored on powered reels aboard the trolleytrucks offered them increased mobility right at the load point.

In 2014 Siemens announced the imminent start of a demonstration phase for an eHighway system in the area served by the Port of Los Angeles and Port of Long Beach. The announcement stated the eHighway would be a one-mile two-way stretch of road on the north- and south-bound sections of Alameda Street near where it intersects with Sepulveda Boulevard in Carson, California. The trucks have a second power source (diesel, compressed natural gas (CNG), or battery) so they can pull out from under the wires e.g. to pass a stopped vehicle, or when not using the eHighway. They are built by Mack Trucks in cooperation with Siemens. The demonstration phase is scheduled to last for one year. The initial announcement anticipated the trials would start in 2015; however, the system did not begin use until 2017

New Mexico
The El Chino Mine near Santa Rita, New Mexico installed trolleytrucks in 1967. The trucks are equipped with diesel engines and the trolley power is used to assist the trucks up and down the ramp that leads into the mine.  This type of double power arrangement is known as a trolley assist system.

Nevada

Barrick's Goldstrike mine, Nevada used trolleytrucks from 1994 to 2001 when the trolley system was decommissioned due to a large reconfiguration of the mine.  The system was similar to the one used in the Palabora copper mine in South Africa.

Zambia
Trolleytrucks were used in the Zambia Consolidated Copper Mines Nchanga Mine in Zambia from 1983 until later in the 1980s. Inexpensive hydroelectricity is generated at the Kariba Power Station along the Zambezi river and distributed throughout the "copper belt" of Zambia.  The current delivery for the trolley power assisted diesel trucks was done
through custom designed bus bars and large current collection shoes mounted on very large trolley pole-like collectors.

See also

 Battery electric bus
 CarGoTram
 Dump truck
 Electric bus
 Parallel overhead lines
 Trolleybus

References

External links

 Copper Mountain Trolley Assist Project
 Siemens' hybrid trolley trucks
 The New Trolley Truck on Highway
 The St. Lambrecht Trolley-truck Line
 Trolleytruck Photos
 English Russia » Electric-powered Trucks in Russia

Battery electric vehicles
Electric vehicles
Trucks